Pennsylvania wine refers to wine made from grapes grown in the U.S. state of Pennsylvania.  The climate in Pennsylvania is mild compared to surrounding states, with the moderating effects of Lake Erie to the north and the Atlantic Ocean to the east.  119 wineries are located in all parts of the state, including five designated American Viticultural Areas.  Pennsylvania is the eighth-largest wine producing state in the country.

The commercial wine industry had important roots in Pennsylvania. Around 1740, the first hybrid of vitis vinifera European grapes and vitis labrusca North American grapes was discovered near Philadelphia. It was initially named Alexander, after the gardener who discovered it. In 1786, Frenchman Pierre 'Peter' Legaux founded the Pennsylvania Vine Company, also just outside of Philadelphia, which would become the nation's first commercial vineyard.

References

External links
 Pennsylvania Wines Pennsylvania Winery Association
 PA Vine Co. Pennsylvania Winery Guide focused on dry wines

 
Wine regions of the United States by state